The Urban Planning Society of China (UPSC), voluntarily incorporated by urban planners across the People's Republic of China in 1956, is the only legally registered academic organization at state level.

Aims
UPSC is devoted to organizing international and national academic activities involving urban planning issues, promoting planning knowledge and technologies, providing consulting service to governmental agencies at all levels, publishing planning books, academic papers and other publications, protecting the lawful rights of urban planners, conducting professional development, granting honour and award to distinguished individuals or organizations.

History
Urban Planning Society of China was formerly known as Urban and Rural Planning Committee under the Architectural Society of China. It was ceased for any activity during the Cultural Revolution period and was re-organized in August 1978. In 1992, UPSC formally registered as a non-governmental organization with approval by Ministry of Construction and Ministry of Civil Affairs.  UPSC former and current Presidents are Wang Wenke, Cao Hongtao, Zheng Xiaoxie, Wu Liangyong and Zhou Ganzhi.

Organization
UPSC has four working committees, i.e. organizational, youth, publishing and academic, and eleven academic committees, i.e. regional planning and urban economy, residential area planning, planning and design of landscape and environment, planning and design of historic and cultural cities, application of new techniques, small town planning, overseas urban planning, engineering planning, urban design, city ecological planning and construction, urban safety and disaster prevention planning. The Society administrative function stays at Secretariat with three subordinate offices, i.e. Editorial Department, Consulting Department and Liaison Office. The past and current Secretary General include An Yongyu, Xia Zonggan and Shi Nan.

See also
China Society of Urban Sciences Research (CSUSR) 
China City Planning Association (CCPA)
International Association for China Planning (IACP)
Shanghai Urban Planning Exhibition Hall
Urban Planning in China
Urban village (China)
Ten Great Buildings
Urban agriculture
Architectural conservation
Sino-Singapore Tianjin Eco-city
Urbanization in China
Landscape planning
Urban sprawl
 Association for Computer-Aided Architectural Design Research in Asia (CAADRIA)

Lists
List of cities in China
List of cities in the People's Republic of China
List of cities in the Peo population
List of cities in the People's Republic of China by GDP per capita
List of China administrative divisions by population
List of tallest buildings and structures in the People's Republic of China

Levels:
Direct-controlled municipality
Prefecture-level city (Sub-provincial city)
County-level city (Sub-prefecture-level city)

References

Transitional Urban Space in China

External links
Official website
International Association for China Planning (IACP)
Shanghai Tongji Urban Planning & Design Institute (TJUPDI)
China Town Planning industry Information Network
China Urban Planning Network
The Herbert Offen Research Collection of the Phillips Library at the Peabody Essex Museum
China Academy of Urban Planning & Design (CAUPD) Brief intro 中国城市规划设计研究院

Urban planning in China
Professional associations based in China
1956 establishments in China
Scientific organizations established in 1956